The GeForce 2 series (NV15) is the second generation of Nvidia's GeForce graphics processing units (GPUs). Introduced in 2000, it is the successor to the GeForce 256.

The GeForce 2 family comprised a number of models: GeForce 2 GTS, GeForce 2 Pro, GeForce 2 Ultra, GeForce 2 Ti, GeForce 2 Go and the GeForce 2 MX series. In addition, the GeForce 2 architecture is used for the Quadro series on the Quadro 2 Pro, 2 MXR, and 2 EX cards with special drivers meant to accelerate computer-aided design applications.

Architecture

The GeForce 2 architecture is similar to the previous GeForce 256 line but with various improvements. Compared to the 220 nm GeForce 256, GeForce 2 is built on a 180 nm manufacturing process, making the silicon more dense and allowing for more transistors and a higher clock speed. The most significant change for 3D acceleration is the addition of a second texture mapping unit to each of the four pixel pipelines. Some say the second TMU was there in the original Geforce NSR (NVIDIA Shading Rasterizer) but dual-texturing was disabled due to a hardware bug; NSR's unique ability to do single-cycle trilinear texture filtering supports this suggestion. This doubles the texture fillrate per clock compared to the previous generation and is the reasoning behind the GeForce 2 GTS's naming suffix: GigaTexel Shader (GTS). The GeForce 2 also formally introduces the NSR (Nvidia Shading Rasterizer), a primitive type of programmable pixel pipeline that is somewhat similar to later pixel shaders. This functionality is also present in GeForce 256 but was unpublicized. Another hardware enhancement is an upgraded video processing pipeline, called HDVP (high definition video processor).  HDVP supports motion video playback at HDTV-resolutions (MP@HL).

In 3D benchmarks and gaming applications, the GeForce 2 GTS outperforms its predecessor by up to 40%. In OpenGL games (such as Quake III), the card outperforms the ATI Radeon DDR and 3dfx Voodoo 5 5500 cards in both 16 bpp and 32 bpp display modes.  However, in Direct3D games running 32 bpp, the Radeon DDR is sometimes able to take the lead.

The GeForce 2 architecture is quite memory bandwidth constrained. The GPU wastes memory bandwidth and pixel fillrate due to unoptimized z-buffer usage, drawing of hidden surfaces, and a relatively inefficient RAM controller. The main competition for GeForce 2, the ATI Radeon DDR, has hardware functions (called HyperZ) that address these issues. Because of the inefficient nature of the GeForce 2 GPUs, they could not approach their theoretical performance potential and the Radeon, even with its significantly less powerful 3D architecture, offered strong competition. The later NV17 revision of the NV11 design, used for the GeForce 4 MX, was more efficient.

Releases
The first models to arrive after the original GeForce 2 GTS was the GeForce 2 Ultra and GeForce2 MX, launched on September 7, 2000. On September 29, 2000 Nvidia started shipping graphics cards which had 16 and 32 MB of video memory size.

Architecturally identical to the GTS, the Ultra simply has higher core and memory clock rates. The Ultra model actually outperforms the first GeForce 3 products in some cases, due to initial GeForce 3 cards having significantly lower fillrate. However, the Ultra loses its lead when anti-aliasing is enabled, because of the GeForce 3's new memory bandwidth/fillrate efficiency mechanisms; plus the GeForce 3 has a superior next-generation feature set with programmable vertex and pixel shaders for DirectX 8.0 games.

The GeForce 2 Pro, introduced shortly after the Ultra, was an alternative to the expensive top-line Ultra and is faster than the GTS.

In October 2001, the GeForce 2 Ti was positioned as a cheaper and less advanced alternative to the GeForce 3. Faster than the GTS and Pro but slower than the Ultra, the GeForce 2 Ti performed competitively against the Radeon 7500, although the 7500 had the advantage of dual-display support. This mid-range GeForce 2 release was replaced by the GeForce 4 MX series as the budget/performance choice in January 2002.

On their 2001 product web page, Nvidia initially placed the Ultra as a separate offering from the rest of the GeForce 2 lineup (GTS, Pro, Ti), however by late 2002 with the GeForce 2 considered a discontinued product line, the Ultra was included along the GTS, Pro, and Ti in the GeForce 2 information page.

GeForce 2 MX

Since the previous GeForce 256 line shipped without a budget variant, the RIVA TNT2 series was left to fill the "low-end" role—albeit with a comparably obsolete feature set. In order to create a better low-end option, NVIDIA created the GeForce 2 MX series, which offered a set of standard features, specific to the entire GeForce 2 generation, limited only by categorical tier. The GeForce 2 MX cards had two 3D pixel pipelines removed and a reduced available memory bandwidth. The cards utilized either SDR SDRAM or DDR SDRAM with memory bus widths ranging from 32-bit to 128-bits, allowing circuit board cost to be varied. The MX series also provided dual-display support, something not found in the regular GeForce 256 and GeForce 2.

The prime competitors to the GeForce 2 MX series were ATI's Radeon VE / 7000 and Radeon SDR (which with the other R100's was later renamed as part of the 7200 series). The Radeon VE had the advantage of somewhat better dual-monitor display software, but it did not offer hardware T&L, an emerging 3D rendering feature of the day that was the major attraction of Direct3D 7. Further, the Radeon VE featured only a single rendering pipeline, causing it to produce a substantially lower fillrate than the GeForce 2 MX. The Radeon SDR, equipped with SDR SDRAM instead of DDR SDRAM found in more expensive brethren, was released some time later, and exhibited faster 32-bit 3D rendering than the GeForce 2 MX. However, the Radeon SDR lacked multi-monitor support and debuted at a considerable higher price point than the GeForce 2 MX. 3dfx's Voodoo4 4500 arrived too late, as well as being too expensive, but too slow to compete with the GeForce 2 MX.

Members of the series include GeForce 2 MX, MX400, MX200, and MX100. The GPU was also used as an integrated graphics processor in the nForce chipset line and as a mobile graphics chip for notebooks called GeForce 2 Go.

Successor
The successor to the GeForce 2 (non-MX) line is the GeForce 3. The non-MX GeForce 2 line was reduced in price and saw the addition of the GeForce 2 Ti, in order to offer a mid-range alternative to the high-end GeForce 3 product.

Later, the entire GeForce 2 line was replaced with the GeForce 4 MX.

Models

Support 

Nvidia has ceased driver support for GeForce 2 series, ending with GTS, Pro, Ti and Ultra models in 2005 and then with MX models in 2007.

GeForce 2 GTS, GeForce 2 Pro, GeForce 2 Ti and GeForce 2 Ultra:
 Windows 9x & Windows Me: 71.84 released on March 11, 2005; Download; Product Support List Windows 95/98/Me – 71.84.
 Windows 2000 & 32-bit Windows XP: 71.89 released on April 14, 2005; Download; Product Support List Windows XP/2000 - 71.84.
 Linux 32-bit: 71.86.15 released on August 17, 2011; Download

GeForce 2 MX & MX x00 Series:
 Windows 9x & Windows Me: 81.98 released on December 21, 2005; Download; Product Support List Windows 95/98/Me – 81.98.
 Windows 2000, 32-bit Windows XP & Media Center Edition: 93.71 released on November 2, 2006; Download. (Products supported list also on this page)
Windows 95/98/Me Driver Archive Windows XP/2000 Driver Archive
 Driver version 81.98 for Windows 9x/Me was the last driver version ever released by Nvidia for these systems. No new official releases were later made for these systems.
 For Windows 2000, 32-bit Windows XP & Media Center Edition also available beta driver 93.81 released on November 28, 2006; ForceWare Release 90 Version 93.81 - BETA.
 Linux 32-bit: 96.43.23 released on September 14, 2012; Download;

Competing chipsets 
3dfx Voodoo 5
ATI Radeon
PowerVR Series 3 (Kyro)

See also 
Graphics card
Graphics processing unit

References

External links 

 Nvidia: GeForce2 leading-edge technology
 Nvidia: GeForce2 Go
 ForceWare 71.84 drivers, Final Windows 9x/ME driver release for GeForce 2 GTS/Pro/Ti/Ultra
 ForceWare 81.98 drivers, Final Windows 9x/ME driver release for GeForce 2 MX series
 ForceWare 71.89 drivers, Final Windows XP driver release for GeForce 2 GTS/Pro/Ti/Ultra
 ForceWare 94.24 drivers, Final Windows XP driver release for GeForce 2 MX series
 Tom's Hardware VGA Charts (w/ GF2)
 techPowerUp! GPU Database

Computer-related introductions in 2000
2 Series
Graphics cards